Wolfgang Weyrauch (15 October 1904 – 7 November 1980) was a German writer, journalist, and actor. He wrote under the pseudonym name Joseph Scherer.

Life and work 
Wolfgang Weyrauch was born Königsberg, Prussia as the son of a surveyor. After attending gymnasium, and receiving his Abitur, he began going to acting school in Frankfurt am Main in 1924. Between 1925 and 1927, he acted in theaters in Münster, Bochum, and at the Harztheater in Thale. From 1927 to 1929, Weyrauch pursued German history, German studies, and Romance studies at Goethe University Frankfurt.

In 1929, he began working as a freelance writer, from 1929 to 1933, at the Frankfurter Zeitung, from 1932 to 1938, at the Berliner Tageblatt, and, from 1933 to 1934, at the Vossische Zeitung. In the 1930s, Weyrauch also began to write radio plays, a newly emerged art form. During the 1930s, Weyrauch also worked as a literary editor, and published his first books. From 1940 to 1945, he worked in an air intelligence unit in World War II. In 1945, he was held in a Soviet prisoner of war camp, and was released in the same year.

After 1945, Weyrauch wrote radio plays, and narratives, and published numerous anthologies (see list below). From December 1945 to 1948, Weyrauch was the editor of Ulenspiegel, a satirical magazine, and Ost und West, both published in Berlin. He shaped the direction of "Kahlschlagliteratur" in Tausend Gramm, a 1949 anthology edited by him, characterizing and promoting the rebirth of German literature, after the end of the Third Reich. From 1950 to 1958, he was a literary editor at the Hamburg publisher, Rowohlt Verlag. Beginning in 1959, he returned to freelance writing, first in Gauting, near Munich, and in Darmstadt, after 1967.

Weyrauch was a member of the West German P.E.N., and the German Writers' Union. In 1951, he began taking part in Gruppe 47 conferences, and, in 1967, he became a member of the Deutsche Akademie für Sprache und Dichtung in Darmstadt, where he died.

Awards and honors 
In 1997, the city of Darmstadt created the Wolfgang Weyrauch Prize to encourage young writers with an award, and stipend. The stipend is in the amount of €8,000. During his lifetime, Weyrauch himself was awarded several prizes.

 1962 Hörspielpreis der Kriegsblinden
 1972 Johann Heinrich Merck Ehrung, City of Darmstadt
 1973 Andreas Gryphius Prize
 1979 Ehrengabe des Kulturkreises im Bundesverband der Deutschen Industrie

Works 
General
 Der Main, Berlin 1934
 Strudel und Quell, Berlin 1938
 Ein Band für die Nacht, Leipzig 1939
 Eine Inselgeschichte, Berlin 1939
 Das Liebespaar, Leipzig 1943
 Auf der bewegten Erde, Berlin 1946
 Von des Glücks Barmherzigkeit, Berlin 1946
 Die Liebenden, Munich 1947
 Die Davidsbündler, Hamburg u.a. 1948
 Lerche und Sperber, Munich 1948
 An die Wand geschrieben, Hamburg 1950
 Bitte meiner älteren Tochter, Wien u.a. 1952
 Die Feuersbrunst, Karlsruhe 1952
 Bericht an die Regierung, Frankfurt a. M. 1953
 Die Minute des Negers, Hamburg 1953
 Gesang um nicht zu sterben, Hamburg 1956
 Nie trifft die Finsternis, Berlin 1956
 Anabasis, Hamburg 1959
 Mein Schiff, das heißt Taifun, Olten u.a. 1959
 Das Jahr, München 1961
 Die japanischen Fischer, Weinheim 1961
 Dialog mit dem Unsichtbaren, Olten u.a. 1962
 Das grüne Zelt. Die japanischen Fischer, Stuttgart 1963
 Die Spur, Olten u.a. 1963
 Dialog über neue deutsche Lyrik, Itzehoe-Vosskate 1965
 Komm, München 1965
 Das erste Haus hieß Frieden, Munich 1966
 Etwas geschieht, Olten u.a. 1966
 Unterhaltungen von Fußgängern, Munich 1966
 Geschichten zum Weiterschreiben, Neuwied u.a. 1969
 Flug über Franken und Hessen, Braunschweig 1970
 Ein Clown sagt, Weinheim 1971
 Wie geht es Ihnen?, Neuwied u.a. 1971
 Mit dem Kopf durch die Wand, Darmstadt 1972
 Das Ende von Frankfurt am Main, Stuttgart 1973
 Gedichte, Darmstadt 1974
 Beinahe täglich, Darmstadt u.a. 1975
 Lieber T., Düsseldorf 1976
 Das Komma danach, Pfaffenweiler 1977
 2 Litaneien, Dreieich 1977
 Fußgänger, B-Ebene, Hauptwache, Rolltreppe, hinauf, hinab, Frankfurt am Main 1978
 Hans Dumm, Köln u.a. 1978
 Ein Schluck von Vernunft, Darmstadt 1978
 Blickpunkt Darmstadt, Darmstadt 1979
 Ein Gedicht, was ist das?, Hannover 1980 (with Fritz Deppert)
 Epilog für Darmstadt, Darmstadt 1981
 Anders wär's besser, Würzburg 1982
 Zeugnisse & Zeugen, Büdingen 1982
 Dreimal geköpft, Assenheim 1983
 Proust beginnt zu brennen, Frankfurt am Main 1985
 Atom und Aloe, Frankfurt 1987
 Lebenslauf, Dreieich 1988
 Das war überall, Darmstadt 1998

Translations
 Jehanne Jean Charles: Schrei, wenn du kannst, Bonn 1960 (with Margot Weyrauch)

Edited and published
 1940, Berlin 1940
 Das Berlin-Buch, Leipzig 1941
 Die Pflugschar, Berlin 1947
 Lesebuch für Erwachsene, Lorch, Württemberg and others 1948
 Tausend Gramm, Hamburg and others 1949
 Expeditionen, Munich 1959
 Ich lebe in der Bundesrepublik, Munich 1960
 Alle diese Straßen, Munich 1965
 Lyrik aus dieser Zeit 1965/66, Esslingen 1965 (with Johannes Poethen)
 Ausnahmezustand, Munich 1966
 Unser ganzes Leben, Munich 1966 (with Geno Hartlaub, Martin Gregor-Dellin, Heinz Piontek, and Heinrich Vormweg)
 Federlese, München 1967 (with Benno Reifenberg)
 Lyrik aus dieser Zeit 1967/68, Munich and others 1967 (with Johannes Poethen)
 11 Autoren über 1 Jahrzehnt, Berlin 1970
 Von Darmstadt nach Darmstadt, Darmstadt 1972 (with Fritz Deppert)
 Das Kellerbuch, Darmstadt 1973
 Neue Expeditionen, Munich 1975
 Vom Fischer und seiner Frau, Weinheim 1976 (with Hans-Joachim Gelberg and Willi Glasauer)
 Kalenderbuch, Köln 1977
 Das Lächeln meines Großvaters und andere Familiengeschichten, Düsseldorf 1978
 Aufschlüsse, Modautal-Neunkirchen 1978
 Liebeserklärungen, Darmstadt 1978 (with Fritz Deppert)
 Liebesgeschichten, Gütersloh 1979
 Literarischer März, Munich 1979 (with Fritz Deppert and Karl Krolow)
 Mein Gedicht ist die Welt, Frankfurt am Main
 Vol. 1. 1780 bis 1912, 1982
 Vol. 2. 1912 bis 1982, 1982

Sources 
 Irmela Schneider (Ed.): Zu den Hörspielen Wolfgang Weyrauchs. Siegen 1981.
 Ulrike Landzettel: "Mein Gedicht ist mein Messer". Darmstadt 1991.
 Ulrike Landzettel: Wolfgang Weyrauch. In: Kritisches Lexikon zur deutschsprachigen Gegenwartsliteratur. Edited by Heinz Ludwig Arnold. 56. Nachlieferung. text + kritik, Munich 1997.
 Ulrike Landzettel: Identifikationen eines Eckenstehers. Der Schriftsteller Wolfgang Weyrauch (1904-1980). Dissertation an der Universität Marburg 2003.
 Werner Bellmann: Wolfgang Weyrauch: "Uni". In: Deutsche Kurzprosa der Gegenwart. Interpretationen. Edited by W.B. und Christine Hummel. Reclam, Stuttgart 2006. pp. 85–93.

References

External links 
 

1904 births
1980 deaths
German male writers
Writers from Königsberg